Veli is a 1985 Indian Tamil-language film directed by Durai, starring Saritha and Rajesh. It was released on 24 July 1985.

Plot

Cast 
Saritha
Rajesh
Sumithra
Sathyaraj
Jaishankar

Soundtrack 
The music was composed by Shankar–Ganesh.

Reception 
Jayamanmadhan of Kalki praised the performances of Rajesh, Sathyaraj and the film's message but felt the film was dragged in second half and concluded it felt like a series that was supposed to end in ten weeks but dragged for 17-18 weeks.

References

External links 
 

1980s Tamil-language films
1985 films
Films directed by Durai
Films scored by Shankar–Ganesh